The 2017 Michigan Wolverines men's soccer team was the college's 18th season of playing organized men's college soccer. It was the Wolverines' 18th season playing in the Big Ten Conference.

Background 
Michigan finished 8th in the Big Ten Conference regular season in 2016 with a 4–11–4 overall record and a 1–6–1 in-conference record. Michigan won in the first round of the Big Ten Tournament against Rutgers but lost in the quarterfinal to eventual champion Maryland. The team did not earn a spot in the NCAA tournament.

Roster

Competitions

Preseason

Regular season

Big Ten Tournament

NCAA Tournament

Statistics

Transfers

See also 
2017 Big Ten Conference men's soccer season
2017 Big Ten Conference Men's Soccer Tournament
2017 NCAA Division I men's soccer season
2017 NCAA Division I Men's Soccer Championship

References 

Michigan Wolverines
Michigan Wolverines men's soccer seasons
Michigan Wolverines, Soccer
Michigan Wolverines
Michigan Wolverines